Football is by far the most popular sport in Thrissur. The city and district has contributed numerable players, clubs, coaches, tournaments and stadiums to Indian football.

Players
Jo Paul Ancheri, former Indian football team Captain and the AIFF Player of the Year is from Thrissur. Ancheri has played for many leading football clubs including Mohun Bagan, JCT FC, FC Kochin and East Bengal F.C. He is a versatile player who can play in any position including defender, defensive midfielder, midfielder, and striker. 
I. M. Vijayan is a former professional football player known as Karutha Muthu (Black Pearl). Vijayan was crowned Indian Player of the Year in 1993, 1997 and 1999. He scored one of the fastest ever international goals in a match against Bhutan in the 1999 SAF Games, when he managed to do the same in 12 seconds. 
Victor Manjila is a former Indian International football goalkeeper from Thrissur. He represented Kerala, as the goalkeeper, in the Santosh Trophy in 1971, 1973, 1974, 1975, 1976, and 1979. Manjila was the captain of the Kerala team that played in 1975 Santosh Trophy. He represented India in the 1976 and 1977 President's Cup at South Korea and Kings Cup at Bangkok. 
C. V. Pappachan has represented Kerala in the Santosh Trophy tournament eight times. He was instrumental in Kerala Police winning two Federation Cups.
Rino Anto (born 3 January 1988) is an Indian professional footballer who plays as a right back for Kerala Blasters and has played for many leading football clubs including Mohun Bagan, Salgaocar F.C., Bengaluru FC and Atletico de Kolkata. He represented India in the 2015–2016.
Rahul Kannoly Praveen commonly known as Rahul K P is an Indian professional footballer who plays as a winger or forward for Kerala Blasters in the Indian Super League. He has been representing India national football team at various youth levels including the FIFA U-17 World Cup 2017.

Football clubs

 R B Ferguson Club, the first and the oldest football club in Kerala state, was established in 20 February 1899 in Ollur, Thrissur. The club was named after the Kochi Police Superintendent, R B Ferguson. Later club renamed as Young Men's Football Club Ollur.
 In 1947, the second oldest club in Thrissur, Aurora Club, Ollur was formed by the football loving fans of Ollur.
 Thrissur Gymkhana, an upcoming football club from Thrissur, has won many tournaments across Kerala.

 F.C. Kerala, a new football team based in Thrissur is in the I-League.
 FC Thrissur , a new football team based in Thrissur, Thrissur Municipal Corporation Stadium as Home Stadium
 Red Star FC, another club promoted by team of entrepreneurs from Thrissur is also blossoming. It is headed by Jo Paul Ancheri.

 Parappur FC, a football club having coaching programs for children at Parappur in Thrissur district. It is supported by South Indian Bank.

Tournaments
The first football tournament in central Kerala was kicked off in 1925 by the Kochi Athletic Association. The tournament was held in Palace Ground now known as Thrissur Municipal Corporation Stadium. Rama Varma XV, Maharaja of Cochin has contributed 100 Tola of silver cup for the tournament. The first winner was Church Mission Society High School Union, Thrissur.  The tournament was winded up in 1930 when the first FIFA World Cup was started.N.I. David Memorial Trophy, once dubbed as the football World Cup of Thrissur was started in 1996 by the then Superintendent of Police, Thrissur, in memory of N. I. David IPS who died in harness in the office of the Commandant, KAP 1st Battalion, Thrissur. The tournament had to be stopped temporarily in 2005 but later restarted in 2010.

Coaches
T.K. Chathunni, also known as the travelling coach was a coach for National Football League (India) from 1997-1998. Hailing from Thrissur, he has coached most of football clubs in India like Dempo S.C., Salgaocar F.C., Mohun Bagan A.C., Churchill Brothers S.C., Chirag United Club Kerala and Josco FC. 
Victor Manjila, another football gem from Thrissur, is a successful former coach of Kerala football team that won 1993 Santosh Trophy.
M. Peethambaran, former Kerala Santosh Trophy coach is also from Thrissur.

References

 
Football in Kerala